"We Are.", stylized as We are., is Do As Infinity's sixth single, released in 2000.

This song was included in the band's compilation albums Do the Best and Do the A-side.

Track listing
 "We Are."
 
 "New World"
 "Summer Days" (8.27 Live version)
 "We Are." (Instrumental)
  (Instrumental)
 "New World" (Instrumental)

Chart positions

External links
 "We Are." at Avex Network
 "We Are." at Oricon

2000 singles
Do As Infinity songs
Songs written by Dai Nagao
2000 songs
Avex Trax singles